Morteza Najafipoor Moghaddam (born 1980), better known as Shahin Najafi,                                              is an Iranian musician, singer, composer, poet, author, and political activist.

Najafi's songs mostly deal with issues such as theocracy, poverty, sexism, censorship, child labor, execution, drug addiction and homophobia. In interviews, he has stated that he strives to use poetic, literary, philosophical and political elements in his music.

Early life

Shahin Najafi was born in 1980 in Bandar-e Anzali, Iran. When he was six years old, his father died, and later his brother became a drug addict and also died. He began writing poetry as a teenager and began learning the guitar in the classical and flamenco styles at the age of 18. He then became an underground artist in Iran, performing in both rock and Spanish music styles, working with various bands.

He studied sociology at the University of Gilan and openly expressed his opinions about the university, leading to him getting expelled.

Music career

Immigration to Germany
Najafi was head of an underground music band in Iran before his immigration to Germany, but he was banned for his offenses towards the Islamic faith in Iran by the Iranian government after his second music show. He was also the head of the Inan music band in Germany. Then he joined the Tapesh 2012 music band. Tapesh 2012 were welcomed by Persian broadcasters and the international media by political and social songs and poems of Najafi.

An article published in No. 19194 of the conservative newspaper Kayhan on 29 September 2008 criticized Tapesh 2012's activities. Kayhan published the article titled Establishing democracy with drum & circle. A part of it goes as follows:

Release of first studio album
On 1 May 2008, Najafi released his first studio album, Ma mard nistim (We Are Not Men), with partnership and composition of the Tapesh 2012 music band. This album was his official and professional beginning in Persian hip hop music. The album attracted the audience and listener more than any album before it was released in Persian hip hop style.

Separation from Tapesh 2012
Najafi ended cooperation with Tapesh 2012 from the beginning of 2009. A variety of reasons have been proposed related to his separation from this group. The main reason is releasing the "Around us" single song in Voice of America TV without permission. The supervisor of Tapesh 2012 later apologised to Najafi and stated: the song has been inadvertently released in Voice of America TV. Najafi accepted the apology.

Reaction to the 2009 Iranian presidential election
After the Iranian election protests, Najafi released a single named Neda in July 2009 dedicated to Neda Agha-Soltan, an activist killed during the protests. He released his second studio album titled Tavahhom (Illusion) on 19 September 2009 by the German-Iranian publishing house "Pamas-Verlag". In this album, several songs are about the intense protests against the Iranian government and the political oppression that occurred after the presidential election.
Can be cited to "Vaghti khoda khabe (When God is asleep)" through these songs. The song's lyrics protest the 2009 Iran poll protests trial, militia violence, the use of torture on prisoners and the Supreme Leader of Iran.

Formation of Antikarisma
He formed a new rock band as Antikarisma band in January 2010. The new band, Antikarisma, consists of Najafi, Babak Khazaei, Armin Mostaed, and Pejman Afshari, who live in Germany.

Fatwas and death threats
Following the release of the song "Ay Naghi!" ("Hey, Naghi!"), Grand Ayatollah Lotfollah Safi Golpaygani, a then 93-year-old Shi’ite cleric based in Qom, issued a fatwa death sentence against Najafi for apostasy. Grand Ayatollah Naser Makarem-Shirazi, a "source of emulation" for many Shia Muslims, also issued a fatwa declaring Najafi guilty of apostasy. As of 15 May 2012, more than 800 people in Iran had joined a Facebook campaign calling for Najafi to be executed, saying they were ready to assassinate him if necessary. An Iranian web site, Shia-Online.ir, offered a US$100,000 bounty to anyone who killed Najafi.

In May 2012, the online site HonareNab.ir posted an online "Shoot the Apostates" flash computer game inviting people to shoot and kill Najafi. "Those who love Imam Hadi can practice killing Shahin Najafi by playing this flash game," said Honar Nab Eslam, who developed the game.

On 25 May 2012, Shiite cleric Ahmad Alamolhoda demanded a plan to execute Najafi.

In June 2012, forty authors of the Rah-e Nikan religious publishing house promised to give royalties from their books to whoever killed Najafi.

The song has drawn sharp anger from protesters who believe it is offensive towards Imam Naghi, the 10th Imam in Shi’ite Islam.
In an interview, Najafi stated that he was inspired by "The Campaign to Remind Shiites about Imam Naghi" to compose the song. The campaign is a Facebook page that pokes fun at Islamic, and specifically Shi'ite, hadiths, with members creating fake, funny hadiths and stories centered around a fictional character named Naghi, who is based on Imam Naghi.

2012 US tour
Najafi started a United States tour in 2012, starting with a talk on 30 September, and later a concert on 16 November at University of California, Berkeley, events sponsored by Iranian Student Alliance in United States of America. He continued the tour in UC San Diego on 18 November.

Political and social activities
In addition to individual work in his concerts and campaign songs, Najafi had many performances on various political and social occasions. In October 2008, he had a music show on "Peace Conference" in Germany.
In August 2009, with some poets and writers in shows of ""Night of solidarity with the liberal struggle"", Najafi had a protest rock show in Stockholm, Sweden.
In December 2009, coinciding with "Student Day" in Iran, Najafi with Ziba Shirazi had a protest music show at Georgetown University, Washington, D.C.

Discography

Albums
 Illusion (2009)
 The Year of Blood (2010)
 Hich Hich Hich (2012)
 Tramadol (2013)
 Sade (2015)
 Radikal (2017)
 Jens Sevom (2019)
 Sigma (2022)

With Tapesh 2012
 We Are Not Man (2008)

EP
 1414 (2014)
 chel (2020)

Live
 Meta Phrygian (2017)

Instrumental
 The Sacred and The Violence (2019)

Single tracks
 Shaere tamam shodeh
 Vaghti keh
 Mahdi
 Bega Mega
 Naghi
 Istadeh mordan
 Too halgham
 Period
 Marg Nazli (The death of Nazli)
 Maman
 Eedam (The Execution)
 Sha'aban
 Sane
 To Azam Badet Miad
 Sharre Azam
 Ba Ma
 Vatan
 Enghelabe Tafakor
 Ham Ghafas
 Kobani
 Mamad Nobari
 Fasle Darya
 Neda
 Palange Zakhmi
 Enkar
 Pishe Ghazio Mallagh Bazi
 Amoo Norooz
 Bbbbc
 Salam
 Proletariat
 Ay Leili
 Shahinam
 Blue
 Shayad
 Beh Name to
 Barkhiz
 Ba mohayam
 Masikh
 Bawaasir
 Aman
 Tabar
 Belam
 Shivan
 Seyl
 Akharin Booseh
 Tamam
 Parvaz
 Dictatorie Amameh
 Sookhtam
 Iran 
 Pedar 
 Maryam

Movie 
Till Schauder released a documentary called When God Sleeps based on the life of Najafi, with the production of Sara Nodjoumi. The Hollywood Reporter puts it in a report on the film between the 23 films at the Tribeca Film Festival.

The film is made in 88 minutes in German, Persian and English, and is in the midst of a 2015 terrorist attack. The film is about the details of Shahin's life and, in general, the fatwa of apostasy and life under the shadow of this fatwa.

Books
 When the God is Asleep
 Azazel
 Bitrex
 Tara Ensan

References

External links

 

1980 births
Living people
Critics of Islam
Former Muslims
Iranian atheists
Iranian activists
Iranian blues singers
Iranian guitarists
Iranian male writers
Iranian rappers
Iranian rock musicians
Iranian songwriters
21st-century guitarists
Iranian hip hop musicians
People from Bandar-e Anzali
Iranian emigrants to Germany
21st-century Iranian male singers
People charged with apostasy in Iran